Sir George Bowyer, 6th and 2nd Baronet, KStJ, GCSG, KCPO (3 March 1783 – 1 July 1860), was a British politician. He sat in the House of Commons in two periods between 1807 and 1818, first as a Tory and then as a Whig.

He was the son of Admiral Sir George Bowyer, 5th Baronet, and his second wife Henrietta Brett, daughter of Admiral Sir Piercy Brett, and was born at Radley Hall in Berkshire.

In 1800, he succeeded his father as baronet. Bowyer was educated at Christ Church, Oxford, where he graduated with a Bachelor of Arts degree in 1804 and a Master of Arts in 1807.

He was commissioned as a Captain in the Berkshire Militia on 16 May 1803, but resigned on 13 March 1804.

At the 1807 general election, Bowyer was elected in the Tory interest as a Member of Parliament (MP) for Malmesbury, a seat which he held until his resignation in 1810
by appointment as Steward of the Manor of East Hendred.

He returned to Parliament the following year as a Whig, when he was elected at an unopposed by-election in June 1811 as the MP for Abingdon, following the resignation of Henry Bowyer. He was re-elected in 1812, defeating his Tory opponent by a margin of 112 votes to 11, and held the seat until the 1818 general election. In 1815, financial difficulties forced him to sell the contents of Radley Hall. As a consequence, he moved with his family to Italy, converting to Roman Catholicism in 1850.

On 19 November 1808, he married Anne Hammond Douglas, oldest daughter of Captain Sir Andrew Snape Douglas. They had three sons and a daughter.

Death
Bowyer died at Dresden in Germany, but was buried at Radley. He was succeeded in both baronetcies successively by his sons George and William.

Honours
Bowyer was a Knight of the Venerable Order of Saint John (KStJ), a Knight Grand Cross of the Order of St. Gregory the Great (GCSG) and a Knight Commander of the Order of Pius IX (KCPO).

References

1783 births
1860 deaths
Alumni of Christ Church, Oxford
Royal Berkshire Militia officers
Baronets in the Baronetage of England
Baronets in the Baronetage of Great Britain
English Roman Catholics
Converts to Roman Catholicism from Anglicanism
Knights Grand Cross of the Order of St Gregory the Great
Members of the Parliament of the United Kingdom for English constituencies
People from Radley
UK MPs 1807–1812
UK MPs 1812–1818
Tory MPs (pre-1834)
Whig (British political party) MPs for English constituencies
English expatriates in Italy